Ceremony for the 6th Hundred Flowers Awards was held in 1983, Beijing.

Awards

Best Film

Best Actor

Best Actress

Best Supporting Actor

Best Supporting Actress

External links
China.com.cn
Winners List

1983